Gaynel Hodge (January 4, 1937 – June 3, 2020) was an American recording artist, songwriter and pianist.  He co-wrote the platinum hit 1950s song, "Earth Angel", and was a founding member and musical director of The Platters, The Turks, and The Hollywood Flames.

Biography
Of African American heritage, Gaynel Hodge was born in Los Angeles, California, and was involved in doo-wop, rhythm and blues and jazz from his earliest years. He began writing songs and playing piano professionally by age 13; joining, starting and practising with all-vocal groups on street corners of Los Angeles.

By age 15, Hodge was a regular session musician in recording studios throughout Los Angeles, and had co-written the multi-platinum hit “Earth Angel”. He went on to form the original Platters with his brother, Alex Hodge, and sang and played piano with them on their first 16 recordings.

Hodge wrote, recorded or performed with such artists as Lou Rawls, Aretha Franklin, Stevie Wonder, Johnny "Guitar" Watson, Dr. John, Ted Taylor, Little Johnny Taylor, Richard Berry, Dick Dale, Don and Dewey, The Chambers Brothers, The Rivingtons, The Olympics, Johnny Morissette, Tony Allen and Duane Eddy.

Gaynel moved to Phoenix, Arizona in 1974 after extensively touring with The Ink Spots. He married Margerite Ilona van Steenbergen on October 21, 1975. Hodge was a vivid part of the Phoenix music scene until they moved to the Netherlands in 1999. Hodge lived with his wife in The Hague until 2015, moving to Amsterdam until his death.

Up until his death, he toured several months of the year throughout Europe, the Middle East and the United States.

In later years, Hodge played multiple styles of music and "covers" depending on who was performing with him.  He introduced multiple generations to doo-wop and entertained literally millions of fans throughout the world over his long career. His production company, "Earth Angel Enterprises" was instrumental in assisting up and coming artists.

Hodge died on June 3, 2020, at the age of 83 in Amsterdam, the Netherlands.

References

External links
The official website for Gaynel Hodge. (Authorized and Approved by Gaynel Hodge- Oct. 2002.)

1937 births
2020 deaths
African-American pianists
Songwriters from California
RCA Victor artists
20th-century American pianists
American male pianists
21st-century American pianists
20th-century American male musicians
21st-century American male musicians
African-American songwriters
20th-century African-American musicians
21st-century African-American musicians
American male songwriters
The Hollywood Argyles members